An articulated bus, also referred to as a  banana bus, bendy bus, tandem bus, vestibule bus, wiggle wagon, stretch bus, sausage bus or an accordion bus, (either a motor bus or trolleybus) is an articulated vehicle used in public transportation. It is usually a single-decker, and comprises two or more rigid sections linked by a pivoting joint (articulation) enclosed by protective bellows inside and outside and a cover plate on the floor. This allows a longer legal length than rigid-bodied buses, and hence a higher passenger capacity (94–120), while still allowing the bus to maneuver adequately.

Due to their high passenger capacity, articulated buses are often used as part of bus rapid transit schemes, and can include mechanical guidance. The common arrangement of an articulated bus is to have a forward section with two axles leading a rear section with a single axle, with the driving axle mounted on either the front or the rear section. Some articulated buses have a steering arrangement on the rearmost axle which turns slightly in opposition to the front steering axle, allowing the vehicle to negotiate tighter turns, similar to hook-and-ladder fire trucks operating in city environments. A less common variant of the articulated bus is the bi-articulated bus, where the vehicle has two trailer sections rather than one.

History

First example of the articulated bus appeared in Milan (Italy) in the 1937.

There is an ongoing exhibition in Budapest at the Hungarian Technical and Transportation Museum in 2010 with the title "The articulated bus is 50 years old." The Ikarus 180 went into limited production in 1963, and entered serial production in 1966; the Ikarus 180 was discontinued in 1973 when its successor, the Ikarus 280 was released.

In the mid-1960s, AC Transit in California pioneered the American use of a modern articulated bus, operating the experimental commuter coach "XMC 77" (based on Continental Trailways' Bus & Car Co. Super Golden Eagle model) on some of its transbay lines. The XMC-77, which AC Transit dubbed the "Freeway Train", was originally built in 1958, purchased by the District in October 1965, and made its debut run for Line N on 14 March 1966; passengers on the inaugural run were presented with special souvenir tickets. XMC-77 was later exhibited to the public at various locations in the East Bay and the Transbay Terminal. It offered seats for 77 passengers (finished in brown and orange) and an observation lounge, complete with a card table to seat a quartet. Engineering for the XMC-77 was carried out by the local firm of DeLeuw Cather & Co.

In the United States, articulated buses were imported from Europe and deployed in the late 1970s and early 1980s. During this time, rising operating costs led to public takeovers of transit systems, and the pressure to reduce labor (driver) costs in turn meant transporting more passengers in a single vehicle. King County Metro and Caltrans led a Pooled Purchase Consortium, formed in 1976, which later awarded a contract to the AM General/MAN joint venture responsible for assembling MAN SG 220 (from Germany) articulated buses in America. Contemporaneously, Crown entered an agreement with Ikarus to produce the Crown-Ikarus 286, coupling American-made powertrains with the Hungarian Ikarus 280 chassis.

Articulated buses have also been used in Australia, Austria (Gräf & Stift), Italy, Germany (Gaubschat, Emmelmann, Göppel, Duewag, Vetter), Canada (LFS Articulated), Hungary (Ikarus), Poland (Jelcz AP02), Romania (DAC 117 UD). The first modern British "bendy buses" (as they are referred to in the UK and Canada) were built by Leyland-DAB and used in the city of Sheffield in the 1980s. They were subsequently withdrawn from service because they proved to be expensive to maintain.

Advantages and disadvantages

Advantages
The main benefits of an articulated bus over the double-decker bus are rapid simultaneous boarding and disembarkation through more and larger doors, somewhat larger passenger capacity (94–120 versus 80−155), increased stability arising from a lower centre of gravity, smaller frontal area giving less air resistance than double decker buses thus better fuel efficiency, often a smaller turning radius, higher maximum service speed, the ability to pass under low bridges, and improved accessibility for people with disabilities and the elderly.

Disadvantages

In some circumstances of urban operation (such as in areas with narrow streets and tight turns), articulated buses may also be involved in significantly more accidents than conventional buses.  Estimates for London's articulated buses put their involvement in accidents involving pedestrians at over five times the rate of all other buses, and over twice as high for accidents involving cyclists.  In a period when articulated buses made up approximately 5% of the London bus fleet, they were involved in 20% of all bus-related deaths, statistics which eventually led to their replacement. However, these safety statistics may be partly skewed due to the buses having been used on the busiest routes in the most crowded areas of the city, making them look worse than the buses they were being compared with.

Use
An articulated bus is a long vehicle and usually requires a specially trained driver, as maneuvering (particularly reversing) can be difficult. The trailer section of a "puller" bus can be subject to unusual centripetal forces, which many people can find uncomfortable, although this is not an issue with "pushers". Nonetheless, the articulated bus is highly successful in Budapest, Hungary, where the BKV city transit company has been operating more than 1000 of them every day since the early 1970s. The Hungarian company Volán also runs hundreds of articulated buses on intercity lines.

Europe

Articulated buses have been used in most European countries for many years. Articulated buses became popular in mainland Europe due to their increased capacity compared with regular buses. In many cities, lower railway bridge clearances have precluded the use of double-deck vehicles, which have never achieved great popularity there. Overhead wires for trams, trolleybuses, etc. are not really relevant issues, as the minimum normal clearance above road level is standard across the EU and is well in excess of the height of a double-deck vehicle—otherwise, many freight vehicles would encounter severe problems in the course of normal operation.

Malta
From 3 July 2011 to 28 August 2013, articulated Mercedes Citaro buses purchased from London were used in Malta by the company Arriva on a number of routes across the country. A number of serious engine fires resulted in their withdrawal from service, and they have also been responsible for causing an increase in traffic congestion and accidents involving pedestrians and cyclists.

United Kingdom

Until 1980, articulated buses were illegal on the UK's roads. A 1979 experiment by South Yorkshire Passenger Transport Executive with buses manufactured by MAN and Leyland-DAB led to a change in the law, but the experiment was abandoned in 1981 because double-decker buses were generally considered less expensive both to purchase and to operate. The cost and weight of the strengthened deck framing and staircase of a double-decker was lower than the cost and weight of the additional axle(s) and coupling mechanism of an articulated bus. Modern technology has reduced the weight disadvantage, and the benefits of a continuous low floor allowing easier access plus additional entrance doors for smoother loading have led to reconsideration of the use of articulated buses in the UK.

In London, articulated buses were used on some routes from 2001 until 2011, but they were not a success. Boris Johnson, former Mayor of London, promised in the run-up to the mayoral election of 2008 to rid the city of the controversial buses and replaced them with double deckers.

Elsewhere in the UK, they are generally operated on particular routes in order to increase passenger numbers, rather than across entire networks. With unsupervised "open boarding" through three doors and the requirement for pre-purchase of tickets, levels of fare-dodging on the new vehicles were found to be at least three times higher than on conventional buses where entry of passengers is monitored by the driver or conductor. The only way of checking for free riders was to use large teams of ticket inspectors to swamp the bus and inspect all tickets while keeping the doors closed, meanwhile delaying the further progress of the bus. Since the articulated buses were tending to serve areas of relative deprivation it is suspected that this was a contributory factor in Transport for London (TfL) turning against the concept.

Many of the articulated buses from London went on to serve with regional operators. Aside from limited use in regional cities, articulated buses may now be found at airports as park and ride shuttles.

In 2020, twenty one brand new Mercedes Benz Citaros entered service at Stansted Airport; the Mercedes Benz Citaro is probably the only articulated bus available in the United Kingdom at present.

Asia

China
In Asia, many major Chinese cities had fleets of articulated buses prior to the late 1990s.  Some of these fleets have since been replaced by single-section units except in a few cities, namely Beijing, Shanghai, and Hangzhou. While in the 2000s a surge in BRT construction has reintroduced or re-purposed the articulated bus fleets for rapid transit usage in cities like Changzhou, Chengdu, Dalian, Guangzhou, Jinan, Kunming, Xiamen, Yancheng, Zaozhuang, and Zhengzhou.

Indonesia 

Indonesia first operated articulated bus in 1993, when Jakarta's bus company PPD began to operating Ikarus articulated busses from Hungary on their several busy lines. Later, the company also imported Chinese-made articulated busses. PPD dominating Jakarta city bus service until 2004, when Transjakarta was established and operates one of the longest BRT systems in the world. Transjakarta has been using articulated buses manufactured by Scania for some of their busiest routes since 2015. Prior to Scania buses introduction, there were Chinese-made Huanghai, Zhong Tong, Yutong, Ankai, and local-made INKA Inobus and AAI Komodo buses already in-service since 2010.

Israel
In Israel, the use of articulated buses—commonly called accordion bus, אוטובוס אקורדיון—is widespread, particularly in Gush Dan and Jerusalem, the two great urban centers of the country. The long buses are considered reliable and useful, and have been in service in Israel since the mid-1970s. During the Israeli–Palestinian conflict, such buses were often targeted by Palestinians and suicide bombers during rush hours, since a crowded long bus can contain more than 100 passengers. Due to the al-Aqsa Intifada wave of mass bombings, security measures were enforced and today many long buses in Israel are accompanied by a security guard.

Macau

In Macau, Transmac – Transportes Urbanos de Macau S.A.R.L. imported an 18-meter articulated bus model, and put it into operation on 6 January 2018 following multiple tests and adjustments. The bus operated on route 51 during peak hours.

Singapore 
In Singapore, articulated buses were first introduced in 1996 by Trans-Island Bus Services (now SMRT Buses) with the Mercedes-Benz O405G buses (bodied in Hispano Carrocera (MK1/MK2), Hispano Habit and Volgren CR221). In 2015, SMRT introduced 40 MAN NG363F A24 buses to replace the first batch of O405Gs, while the subsequent batches were replaced by double deck buses issued by the Land Transport Authority. All Hispano Habit-bodied O405Gs have been retired from service as of December 2020 as part of Land Transport Authority's policy of a 100% wheelchair-accessible bus fleet.

Singapore Bus Services (SBS, present-day SBS Transit) introduced one Duple Metsec-bodied Volvo B10MA and one Volgren-bodied Mercedes Benz O405G in 1996 and 1997 respectively to evaluate the suitability of articulated buses for high-capacity single deck bus operations. The trial was however unsuccessful and SBS stuck to the use of 12-metre double deck "Superbuses". The two articulated buses were eventually sold off to Bayes Coachlines of Dairy Flat, Auckland in New Zealand in March 2006. SBS Transit only began to operate articulated buses again from March 2018 when ten ex-SMRT MAN A24 buses were transferred to SBS Transit in batches by the Land Transport Authority as part of the Seletar Bus Package under the Bus Contracting Model.

In March 2021, Tower Transit took over 1 ex-SMRT MAN A24 bus from SMRT Buses in preparation for the takeover of Sembawang-Yishun Bus Package. Tower Transit took over more units as part of the transition in September 2021.

Taiwan
Articulated buses were first used in Taiwan in 2014 as the Taichung BRT. The BRT system was abolished a year later, and the articulated buses run as regular buses along the same route.

Vietnam
In Vietnam, articulated bus was first introduced and operated on 16 October 2010, by Transerco in Hanoi. It was added to the route 07 from My Dinh Bus Station to Noi Bai Airport as a test run. The bus was part of Hanoi Ecotrans project subsidized by EU and Ile de France. It was a Mercedes Euro II Galaxy which first manufactured in December 2003 by Mercedes-Benz Vietnam and was previously used for SEA Games in Hanoi. The bus was painted yellow instead of traditional white-yellow-red (from top to bottom) and had two ticket sellers on-board instead of one. The bus received positive reviews from passengers but the bus no longer operated in Hanoi, route 07 is now occupied by Thaco Huyndai buses and Daewoo BC212MA buses.

North America

United States

Articulated buses are commonplace in US urban centers such as Albuquerque, Austin, Baltimore, Boston, Chicago, Cleveland, Denver, Houston, Indianapolis, Los Angeles, West Palm Beach,Miami, Minneapolis-St.Paul, New York City, Newark, Orange County (California), Orlando, Philadelphia, Phoenix, Pittsburgh, Portland (Oregon), Rochester (New York), San Diego, San Francisco, Seattle, Washington, D.C., and Westchester County (New York). In Eugene, Lane Transit District uses articulated buses on some high-traffic routes, as well as on their Emerald Express (EmX) Bus Rapid Transit Service. In Vancouver, Washington, C-Tran (Washington) uses articulated buses on their BRT service, The Vine (bus rapid transit).

Canada
In Canada, they are used in Brampton, Calgary, Durham Region, Edmonton, Gatineau, Halifax, Hamilton, London, Longueuil, Mississauga, Montreal, Niagara Falls, Ottawa, Quebec City, Saskatoon, Toronto, York Region, Metro Vancouver and Winnipeg.

Mexico
Articulated buses in Mexico are usually used on BRT lines, such as Mexico City's Metrobús, Guadalajara's Macrobús, Monterrey's Ecovía and León's Optibús.

South America
In South America, they are used in Quito, São Paulo, Curitiba, Santiago, Barranquilla, Cali, Bucaramanga, Pereira, Cartagena and Bogotá.

Oceania

Australia

The first articulated bus in Australia operated in Canberra in the Australian Capital Territory in 1974. They remain in service for Transport Canberra serving both rapid and feeder routes.

In Adelaide, articulated buses are used on the O-Bahn Busway, reaching speeds of 100 km/h.  The first articulated buses to use it were the Mercedes-Benz O305G buses; however, three MAN SG280H buses are also equipped for O-Bahn use.  In recent years, it has proven problematic to find suitable low-floor articulated buses to replace the 1984-manufactured Mercedes buses, because the design of the O-Bahn track unfortunately precludes the use of most modern articulated buses. Sydney has seen the operation of articulated buses for many years. Currently it operates a fleet of various models with eighty Volvo B12BLEA buses joining the Sydney Buses fleet in 2005 and 2006, increasing capacity along many of the busy corridors. A number of prototype vehicles were delivered in 2008 & 2009 to operate on Sydney Buses' first Metrobus route, the M10 from Leichhardt to Kingsford and Maroubra Junction.  The buses feature different chassis, body types, and internal layouts. The articulated Volvo B12BLEA buses are fully wheelchair-accessible, air-conditioned, and have visual and audible next-stop passenger information systems installed. The buses feature air-conditioning, large electronic destination displays and cloth seating. Additionally, each bus features a stepless entry, which will assist less-mobile passengers. Flip-up seats in the front part of the bus allow easy accommodation for passengers in wheelchairs and with strollers and prams. In 2009-2010 150 new Volvo B12BLEA articulated buses have been introduced into the Sydney Buses fleet, many of these part of the expanded Metrobus program.

Design

Doors
Articulated buses typically feature at least two and sometimes three curbside doors for passengers. Because the articulation joint is close behind the middle axle, usually four potential passenger door positions are possible on a single-articulated bus:
 Between the windshield and front axle (A)
 Between the front axle and middle axle (B)
 Between the articulation joint and rear axle (X)
 Between the rear axle and rear bulkhead (Y)

Powertrain

Articulated buses can be of "pusher" or "puller" configuration. Very few companies specialise in manufacturing the articulated section for the buses. One that does is ATG Autotechnik GmbH in Siek near Hamburg.

Puller

In most puller articulated buses, the engine is mounted under the floor between the front and middle axles, and only the middle axle is powered. On the other hand, they can be used in very narrow or severely potholed streets. This type of bus also performs better in snowy or icy conditions, as the thrust from the driving wheels does not cause the vehicle to jackknife. Newer models such as the Van Hool AG300 feature low floors while maintaining the puller design by placing the engine block off-center opposite to the second door. Also, the unpowered rear axle is much simpler and carries no engine weight, facilitating the installation of counter-steering mechanisms to further decrease the turning radius.

A typical puller model is the Hungarian-made Ikarus 280, the articulated version of the Ikarus 260, of which 60,993 buses were manufactured between 1973 and 2002, mostly for Soviet bloc customers. (This type accounted for two-thirds of the articulated buses built in the 1970s.) Puller-type articulated buses are built in less numbers, but are still available in Scandinavia and South America. Examples being the Volvo B9S and Volvo B12M.

Pusher
The pusher bus needs a damping system in the joint to reduce the risk of jack-knifing and fishtailing. This was developed by the FFG Fahrzeugwerkstätten Falkenried in Germany. The production cost of the pusher bus was lower than that of a puller bus. The puller bus was a completely different construction compared to a solo bus which was often fabricated by external body construction firms due to the lower production numbers compared to solo buses. The pusher concept enabled the bus manufacturer to simply join a forward and a rear part of a solo bus and build the articulated bus completely in-house. This reduced the production cost.

In pusher buses, only the rear axle is powered by a rear-mounted internal combustion engine, and the longitudinal stability of the vehicle is maintained by active hydraulics mounted under the turntable. This modern system makes it possible to build buses without steps and having low floors along their entire length, which simplifies access for passengers with limited mobility.

Modern low-floor pusher articulated buses also tend to suffer from suspension problems because their wheels lack sufficient travel to enable them to absorb typical road surface unevenness. This also leads to passenger discomfort and relatively rapid disintegration of the vehicle's superstructure.

Makers of pusher-type articulated buses include Mercedes-Benz, New Flyer Industries, MAN, Volvo and Scania. The Renault PR 180 and PR 180.2 (articulated versions of the PR 100 and PR 100.2) were a special variation of the pusher design in which both the middle and the rear axles were driven, with a driveshaft passing through the turntable between the two driving axles.

Alternative power

Although the majority of articulated buses utilise diesel engines for their motive power, a number of operators (primarily outside North America and by LACMTA) have adopted compressed natural gas (CNG) power in order to reduce pollution. Many other transit authorities in the United States and Canada are adopting articulated buses that are diesel-electric hybrids, such as the New Flyer DE60LF. There are also articulated trolleybuses, which use catenary cables to power electric traction motors. Electric articulated trolleybuses principally operate in hilly locations like Mexico City, San Francisco, Seattle, and Vancouver, B.C., where the steep grades preclude the use of combustion engines for motive power.

The New Flyer Xcelsior Charge NG battery-electric articulated buses are equipped with traction motors on both the middle and rear axles; the middle axle uses in-wheel motors.

Articulation

Super-articulated buses
Super articulated bus are similar to the normal articulated buses, but they have a fourth tag axle next to the rear axle, increasing the rated load. Examples include the Mercedes-Benz Citaro CapaCity, MAN Lion's City GXL (A43), Mercedes-Benz O500 DA, BYD D11, and Scania K IA.

Bi-articulated buses

Since the late 1980s, the concept of the articulated bus has been extended further with the addition of a second trailer section that extends the bus almost to tram length and capacity, to create a bi-articulated bus, also called a triple bus. The Chinese manufacturer Zhejiang Youngman (Jinhua Neoplan) has developed the  JNP6280G bi-articulated bus, deemed the "world's largest", which will be used in Beijing.

Bi-articulated buses are still rare, having been trialled and rejected in some places. Because of their length they have a role on very high-capacity routes, or as a component of a bus rapid transit scheme. Major examples of bi-articulated buses playing a major role in bus rapid transit can be found in Curitiba, Bogota, Mexico City, Quito, etc. Volvo is a major supplier of puller-type bi-articulated buses in these markets. In the Netherlands, bi-articulated buses came into service in Utrecht (2002) and Groningen (2014) on busy routes.

Decks
Most articulated buses use a single passenger level or deck.

Double-decker articulated buses
A few attempts have been made to design a double-decker articulated bus. NEOPLAN Bus GmbH built a handful of Neoplan Jumbocruisers between 1975 and 1992. In these models, only the upper deck allows movement between the two sections, so each section has its own doors and set of stairs.

Driver licensing
In some countries of the European Union, as well as in Canada, an articulated bus can be driven with the same license used to drive a rigid bus (D in Europe), while a bus towing a normal trailer requires a bus + trailer (D+E) license.

There is some confusion as to how the U.S. treats articulated buses, but the general agreement in professional circles a large misconception seems to be that they're treated as combination vehicles, and therefore requires that drivers hold a Class A commercial driver license (CDL) with a passenger (P) endorsement, which requires the passage of both a written and driven exam. However, based on guidelines from the Federal Motor Carrier Safety Administration (FMCSA), an articulated motorcoach (bus) driver is required to possess a Class B CDL. The driven exam can be completed in the Class B bus the driver wishes to operate.  It is common for restrictions to be issued on the driver's license disallowing them to operate higher classes of vehicles than they tested on. A common restriction is a driver with a Class B CDL that performs their P endorsement test on a class B bus, resulting in their license bearing the "no class A passenger vehicle" restriction, which is notated with an 'M', in addition to their P endorsement. These restrictions can be removed through further testing at a later date.

In the UK it is only necessary to hold a D licence on articulated buses where the driven axle is in the rear section.
As the front cannot be driven without the rear, for licensing purposes they are not considered to have a trailer necessitating the E entitlement. However, special training is needed for bi-articulated buses.

In popular culture
In a campaign associated with the Transformers: Revenge of the Fallen film, a 2014 Transformers character was created using parts from an articulated bus with the actual vehicle as its intended alternate form and dubbed "Bendy-Bus Prime."

Examples of articulated buses (including coaches and trolleybuses)

 AKSM-333
 Chavdar B14-20
 Chavdar 141
 Classic
 Crown-Ikarus 286
 DAC 117UD
 De Simon IS.2
 Ikarus 280
 Ikarus 417/435/435T
 Inbus AID 280FT
 Irisbus Agora L
 Irisbus Citelis 18
 Irisbus Cristalis 18
 Irisbus Civis
 Iveco Bus Crealis
 Iveco TurboCity
 Iveco Bus Urbanway 18
 Karosa B 741
 Karosa B 941
 Karosa B 961
 Karosa C 744
 Karosa C 943
 Leyland-DAB articulated bus
 LiAZ-6213
 MAN Lion's City G
 MAN NG272
 MAN SG 220
 MAN NG363F (MAN A24)
 MAZ-105
 MAZ-205
 MAZ-215
 Mercedes-Benz CapaCity
 Mercedes-Benz Conecto G
 Mercedes-Benz Citaro G
 Mercedes-Benz O305G
 Mercedes-Benz O405G
 NABI BRT
 NABI LFW
 NABI SFW
 Neoplan AN460
 Neoplan Centroliner
 Neoplan Jumbocruiser
 New Flyer High Floor
 New Flyer Low Floor
 New Flyer Xcelsior
 Nova Bus LFS Artic
 Orion-Ikarus 286
 Otokar Kent C Articulated
 Renault PR180.2
 Rocar DAC 217E
 Scania Citywide LFA
 Scania K UA/K IA
 Scania N UA
 Scania OmniCity
 Scania OmniLink
 Škoda 15Tr
 Škoda 25Tr Irisbus
 Škoda 27Tr Solaris
 Škoda 31Tr SOR
 Škoda 33Tr SOR
 Škoda 35Tr Iveco
 Škoda 706 RTO-K
 Solaris Trollino 18
 Solaris Urbino 18
 SOR NB 18
 SOR NS 18
 TEDOM C 18
 Van Hool AG300
 Volvo 7700
 Volvo 7900
 Volvo 8700LEA
 Volvo B5LH
 Volvo B7LA
 Volvo B8RLEA
 Volvo B9LA
 Volvo B9S
 Volvo B10LA
 Volvo B10MA
 Volvo B12BLEA
 VDL Citea SLFA
 Wright Eclipse Fusion
 Wright Fusion
 Wright Solar Fusion
 Wright StreetCar
 ZiU-10

See also

Articulated buses in the United Kingdom
Bi-articulated bus
 Bombardier Guided Light Transit
Double-decker bus
List of buses
Trailer bus

References

External links
Steering Considerations & Engine Placements

 
Buses by type